Sabine Winter (born 27 September 1992) is a German table tennis player. Her highest career ITTF ranking was 36.

References

1992 births
Living people
German female table tennis players
People from Main-Taunus-Kreis
Sportspeople from Darmstadt (region)
20th-century German women
21st-century German women
World Table Tennis Championships medalists